Saint Acathius (died  437, also known as Acacius or Achates) was bishop of Melitene (now is Malatya in modern Turkey) in the third century, although he is occasionally given as bishop of Antioch. Melitene was capital of the Roman Province of Second Armenia.

Life
He lived in the time of the persecution of Decius, and although it is certain that he was cited before the tribunal of Marcian to give an account of his faith, it is not certain that he died for it. He was indeed condemned to death, but his prudence and constancy so impressed the Emperor as to obtain his discharge from custody after he had undergone considerable suffering.

He was famous both for the splendour of his doctrinal teaching and the miracles he wrought. The Eastern Orthodox Church venerates him on different days, but especially on 31 March. He had also a name of Agathangelos, that means "good angel".

There was a later Acacius, who was also Bishop of Melitene, and who was conspicuous as an opponent of Nestorius at the Council of Ephesus and was unjustly deposed by his flock after opposing Nesorius. He exchanged letters with Cyril of Alexandria and died sometime after 437. His feast day is on 17 April.

References

Armenian saints
3rd-century bishops in Roman Anatolia
3rd-century Christian saints
Year of birth unknown
3rd-century deaths